Park Eun Ji was the vice delegate of the Labor Party in South Korea. She also was a proportional representation candidate of the New Progressive Party in the 19th legislative election. She died at her house on March 8, 2014.

Death
Park was found dead at her home on March 8, 2014, and her death was presumed to be a suicide. There was no suicide note.

See also 
 Roh Hoe-chan
 Park No-ja

References

External links 
 Park Eun Ji's blog 
  
  

1979 births
2014 deaths
New Progressive Party (South Korea) politicians
Labor Party (South Korea) politicians
Suicides by hanging in South Korea